Luis Fernando Argeñal Padilla (born 8 December 1997) is a Honduran professional footballer who plays as a midfielder for Vida in the Honduran Liga Nacional.

Career 
Argeñal made his professional debut with UPNFM in a 1–0 Liga Nacional loss to C.D. Real de Minas on 9 September 2018.

Personal life
Argeñal is the grandson of the Honduran former footballer and manager Carlos Padilla.

References

External links
 

1997 births
Living people
Sportspeople from Tegucigalpa
Honduran footballers
Association football midfielders
Lobos UPNFM players
Liga Nacional de Fútbol Profesional de Honduras players